Marquis Jing may refer to these rulers from China's Zhou dynasty:

Marquis Jing of Jin (died 841 BC)
Marquess Jing of Han (died 400 BC)
Marquess Jing of Zhao (died 375 BC)

See also
Duke Jing (disambiguation)
King Jing (disambiguation)